Ponta do Lobo Lighthouse is a lighthouse located near the headland named Ponta do Lobo, in the southeastern part of the island of Santiago, Cape Verde. The lighthouse is located about 4 km east of the nearest village, Vale da Custa, and 11 km northeast of the capital Praia. The lighthouse was built in 1887 and is the island's second oldest. It is a 9 metres high trapezoidal tower, attached to a single storey keeper's house.

See also
 List of lighthouses in Cape Verde

References

External links
Photo of Ponta do Lobo's lighthouse

São Domingos Municipality, Cape Verde
Lighthouses in Cape Verde